Zuoying station may refer to the following stations in Kaohsiung, Taiwan:

Zuoying HSR station, the metro and railway station served by Kaohsiung MRT, Taiwan High Speed Rail and Taiwan Railways Administration, where it is known as Xinzuoying station
Zuoying–Jiucheng railway station, the exclusive TRA station